In enzymology, a columbamine oxidase is an enzyme that catalyzes the chemical reaction

2 columbamine + O2  2 berberine + 2 H2O

Thus, the two substrates of this enzyme are columbamine and O2, whereas its two products are berberine and H2O.

This enzyme belongs to the family of oxidoreductases, specifically those acting on X-H and Y-H to form an X-Y bond with oxygen as acceptor.  The systematic name of this enzyme class is columbamine:oxygen oxidoreductase (cyclizing). This enzyme is also called berberine synthase.  This enzyme participates in alkaloid biosynthesis i.  It employs one cofactor, iron.

References

 

EC 1.21.3
Iron enzymes
Enzymes of unknown structure